Vabres-l'Abbaye is a commune in the Aveyron department in southern France.

Geography
The village lies in the northern part of the commune, on the right bank of the Dourdou de Camarès, which flows north through the middle of the commune and forms part of its northern border, where it is joined by the Sorgues.

Population

See also
Communes of the Aveyron department
List of medieval bridges in France

References

Communes of Aveyron
Aveyron communes articles needing translation from French Wikipedia